Norm Simpson (20 May 1905 – 23 July 1990) was  a former Australian rules footballer who played with Essendon in the Victorian Football League (VFL).

Notes

External links 
		
Norm Simpson's profile at Australianfootball.com

1905 births
1990 deaths
Australian rules footballers from Victoria (Australia)
Essendon Football Club players